Sakharayapatna is a panchayat town in Chikmagalur district in the Indian state of Karnataka.

The name of the town literally means "the town of the ruler named Sakharaya" in the Kannada Language.

The region around Sakharayapatna is famous for producing juicy jackfruits.

References

Cities and towns in Chikkamagaluru district